Damernas Värld (Swedish: Women's World) is a Swedish language monthly fashion and women's magazine published in Stockholm, Sweden. It is one of the oldest magazines in the country.

History and profile
The magazine was started with the name Flitiga Händer (Swedish: Busy Hands) in November 1939. In 1940 it was renamed as Damernas Värld with the subtitle Flitiga händer. In 1944 the subtitle was removed, and it began to appear with the title Damernas Värld.  The magazine is part of Bonnier Group and is published on a monthly basis by Bonnier Tidskrifter.

Gunny Widell and Martina Bonnier served as the editor-in-chief of the magazine. Its headquarters is in Stockholm. Although the main focus of the magazine is fashion, it also features articles on health and beauty. Since 1982 the magazine offers the Damernas Värld Guldknappen, an annual award targeting Swedish fashion designers.

In April 2015 Damernas Värld celebrated its seventy-fifth anniversary with a cover featuring the editor-in-chief Martina Bonnier.

Circulation
Damernas Värld reached peak levels of circulation during the 1960s and 1970s. The circulation of the magazine was 102,000 copies in 1999. The magazine had a circulation of 87,300 copies in 2010. Its circulation was 85.000 copies in 2013 and 72,300 copies in 2014.

See also
 List of magazines in Sweden

References

External links
 Official website

1939 establishments in Sweden
Bonnier Group
Lifestyle magazines
Magazines established in 1939
Magazines published in Stockholm
Swedish-language magazines
Monthly magazines published in Sweden
Women's magazines published in Sweden
Women's fashion magazines